The 1926–27 Indiana Hoosiers men's basketball team represented Indiana University. Their head coach was Everett Dean, who was in his 3rd year. The team played its home games at the Men's Gymnasium in Bloomington, Indiana, and was a member of the Big Ten Conference.

The Hoosiers finished the regular season with an overall record of 13–4 and a conference record of 9–3, finishing 2nd in the Big Ten Conference.

Roster

Schedule/Results

|-
!colspan=8| Regular Season
|-

References

Indiana
Indiana Hoosiers men's basketball seasons
1926 in sports in Indiana
1927 in sports in Indiana